Edwin Hyland May Jr. (May 28, 1924 – February 20, 2002) was a U.S. Representative from Connecticut.

Born in Hartford, Connecticut, May graduated from Wethersfield High School, Wethersfield, Connecticut, 1942. He graduated from Wesleyan University, Middletown, Connecticut, 1948. He was in the United States Army Air Corps from 1942 to 1945. Thereafter, he was both a business and an insurance and  executive. May was the co-chairman of the inaugural Insurance City Open (now the Travelers Championship) at the Wethersfield Country Club.

May was elected as a Republican to the Eighty-fifth Congress in 1956. May voted in favor of the Civil Rights Act of 1957. He was an unsuccessful candidate for reelection to the Eighty-sixth Congress in 1958. May was Connecticut state Republican chairman from 1958 to 1962, an unsuccessful candidate for Republican nomination for governor of Connecticut in 1962, and a delegate to the Connecticut constitutional convention in 1965. He was an unsuccessful candidate for the United States Senate in 1968.

He died on February 20, 2002, in Fort Pierce, Florida. May was posthumously inducted into the Connecticut State Golf Association the same year.

References

1924 births
2002 deaths
United States Army Air Forces soldiers
United States Army Air Forces personnel of World War II
Wesleyan University alumni
Businesspeople in insurance
Republican Party members of the United States House of Representatives from Connecticut
20th-century American politicians